Celebrate – Live  was the only live album released for The Archers, and the last release of their original contract with Light Records.   Recorded at “Melodyland Christian Center,” in Southern California.

Track listing
"Celebrate" (Riso)
"Wonderful To Feel Your Love" (Thomas)
"Where Could I Go" (Coats)
"Lord, Keep Your Lovin' Hand On Me" (Learning)
"Sunshine On A Cloudy Day" (Archer, Dan Cutrona)
"I'm Gonna Rise" (Nancye Short-Tsapralis)
"It Wouldn't Be Enough" (Aldridge)
"Waitin', Anticipatin'" (T. Archer, S. Archer)
"Fresh Surrender" (Billy Rush Masters)
"Stand Up" (Archer, Phil Kristianson)
"Celebrate (Reprise)" (Riso)

Personnel
 Michael Fickling – drums
 Tim Jaquette - bass guitar
 Tony Sena - electric guitar
 Phil Kristianson - Hammond B-3, clavinet, Fender Rhodes, synthesizers
 Dan Cutrona - acoustic piano, synthesizers, vibraphone, marimba
 Paul Bahn – percussion
 Sandra Couch – percussion
 Steve Archer – percussion
 Charles Davis – trumpet
 Larry Hall – trumpet
 Bill Reichenbach - trombone, euphonium
 Gary Herbig - saxophone, flute
 Stephanie Reach - backing vocals

External links
Light Records Discography
Archers.org

The Archers (musical group) albums
1980 live albums